The Black Session: Paris, 10 May 2011 is a live album by English rock band Wire, released on 7 February 2012 through the band's own label, Pinkflag.

Background 
The album was recorded for the Black Sessions, named for the series of radio broadcasts hosted by Bernard Lenoir for French radio station France Inter and featured on the C'est Lenoir show. The name is a pun based on Bernard Lenoir's name, translated literally as "Bernard the black". Recorded at the radio station's Paris studios on 10 May 2011, Wire performed in front of an invited audience.

The Black Session focuses on tracks from Wire's latest album Red Barked Tree from 2011 but also includes songs from the 1970s and 1980s, as well as "Comet" from 2002's Read & Burn 01 EP. It is the first Wire album to feature touring guitarist Matthew Simms, who would become a permanent member in 2012. The album was initially available as an exclusive tour item during Wire's 2011 UK autumn dates, but was released worldwide in February 2012.

Track listing

Personnel 

 Wire

 Robert Grey – drums
 Graham Lewis – bass, vocals
 Colin Newman – guitar, vocals
 Matthew Simms – guitar

 Production

 Rémi Fessart – engineering, mixing
 Denis Blackham – mastering
 Jon Wozencroft – design, photography

References

External links 
 The Black Session: Paris, 10 May 2011 at Wire's official website
 

Wire (band) live albums
2012 live albums